Date Night is a 2010 American romantic comedy crime film directed by Shawn Levy and written by Josh Klausner.

Starring Steve Carell, Tina Fey, Taraji P. Henson, Common, and Mark Wahlberg, the film tells the story of a case of mistaken identity in New York City, which turns a bored married couple's attempt at a glamorous and romantic evening into something more thrilling and dangerous.

Date Night premiered in New York City on April 6, 2010, and was released theatrically on April 9, 2010, by 20th Century Fox. It grossed $152.3 million against a $55 million budget.

Plot
Phil and Claire Foster are a married couple from New Jersey with two children, Ollie and Charlotte, and whose domestic life has become boring and routine. Their sex life is perfunctory and demystified. Phil is a tax lawyer while Claire is a realtor. They are motivated to reignite their romance after learning that their best friends, Brad and Haley, are planning to divorce to escape the married-life routine and to have more excitement in their lives.

To avoid the routine that had become their weekly "date night", Phil decides that he will take Claire to a trendy Manhattan restaurant, but they cannot get a table. Phil steals a reservation from a no-show couple, the Tripplehorns, despite Claire's misgivings. While eating, they are approached by two men, Collins and Armstrong, who question them about a flash drive they believe Phil and Claire stole from mobster boss Joe Miletto. Phil and Claire explain that they are not the Tripplehorns, but the men do not believe them and threaten them at gunpoint. Not seeing any other way out, Phil lies and tells them it is in a boathouse in Central Park.

At the boathouse, Claire pretends to search and while Collins and Armstrong's backs are turned, Phil hits them with a paddle and escapes with Claire in a boat. At a police station, Phil and Claire talk with Detective Arroyo, but discover Collins and Armstrong are also detectives, presumably on Miletto's payroll. Realizing they cannot trust the police, they decide to find the real Tripplehorns. They return to the restaurant and find the cellphone number of the Tripplehorns.

Claire remembers a former client, Holbrooke Grant, a security expert and James Bond-like action hero. At his apartment, Grant traces the cellphone signal to an apartment owned by Thomas Felton. Collins and Armstrong arrive, but Phil and Claire escape in Grant's Audi R8.

They arrive at Felton's apartment and break in. They question Felton, nicknamed "Taste", and his wife "Whippit" about the flash drive and Joe Miletto. It turns out that they went to the restaurant, but left when they spotted Collins. Realizing they are in danger, the couple give the flash drive to Phil and flee. When Phil and Claire get back in the Audi, Armstrong and Collins shoot at them. Phil and Claire crash the Audi into a Ford Crown Victoria taxicab, resulting in the cars being attached at the bumpers. Phil and the cab driver decide to drive off to get away. Phil climbs into the Ford to navigate while Claire navigates the Audi. Phil inserts the flash drive into the driver's Amazon Kindle and finds pictures of district attorney Frank Crenshaw with prostitutes. After evading Collins and Armstrong, they are eventually hit and are separated by an SUV. The cab falls into the river; Phil and the driver escape, but without the flash drive.

On the subway, Phil determines that Felton obtained the flash drive to blackmail Crenshaw. They return to Grant's apartment, and Grant is reluctant to help after becoming exhausted by their incompetence, but Phil begs and he agrees. Phil and Claire go to an illegal strip club that Crenshaw frequents, with Claire under the guise of a new prostitute and Phil as her pimp. After performing a pole dance for Crenshaw, they confront him and tell him they are the Tripplehorns. Collins and Armstrong come in and hold them at gunpoint and take them up to the roof with Crenshaw. Miletto arrives with henchmen and it is revealed that Crenshaw has been paid by Miletto to keep him out of jail. When Phil mentions the photos, an argument escalates between the mobsters and Crenshaw, Collins and Armstrong talk. Phil asks Claire to count to three (her typical method of calming their children). When she does, a helicopter appears and Arroyo and the SWAT team arrest Miletto, Crenshaw, and everyone else, as well as Collins and Armstrong. Arroyo reveals to Claire that she was notified by Grant, who supplied Phil with a wire.

After being declared heroes, Phil and Claire enjoy breakfast at a diner, where Phil admits he would marry Claire and have their kids all over again if given the chance. When they return home, they engage in enthusiastic kissing on their front lawn before lying on their backs and watching the sky.

Cast
{{Cast listing|
 Steve Carell as Phil Foster
 Tina Fey as Claire Foster
 Mark Wahlberg as Holbrooke Grant
 Taraji P. Henson as Detective Arroyo
 Jimmi Simpson as Detective Armstrong
 Common as Detective Collins
 William Fichtner as District Attorney Frank Crenshaw
 Leighton Meester as Katy
 J. B. Smoove as cabbie
 Kristen Wiig as Haley Sullivan
 Mark Ruffalo as Brad Sullivan
 James Franco as Tom "Taste" Felton/Tripplehorn
 Mila Kunis as "Whippit" Felton/Tripplehorn
 Bill Burr as Detective Walsh
 Nick Kroll as Claw maître d'''
 Olivia Munn as Claw hostess
 Gal Gadot as Natanya
 Jon Bernthal and Ari Graynor as young couple
 will.i.am as himself
 Michelle Galdenzi as Claw hottie
 Ray Liotta as Joe Miletto (uncredited)
}}

Production

Filming began in mid-April 2009.

Soundtrack
Confirmed songs for the soundtrack are listed below:

 "Blitzkrieg Bop" by The Ramones
 "Burn It to the Ground" by Nickelback
 "Love Gun" by Cee-Lo Green featuring Lauren Bennett
 "Heartbreak Warfare" by John Mayer
 "Cobrastyle" by Teddybears featuring Mad Cobra
 "Why Me" by Margie Balter
 "Date Night Blues" by The Rave-Ups
 "French Connection" by Solar Budd
 "I'll Never Dream" by Kaskade
 "Moving On" by Morgan Page
 "Fresh Groove" by Muddy Funksters
 "I Want'a Do Something Freaky to You" by Leon Haywood
 "Sex Slave Ship" by Flying Lotus
 "God Created Woman" by A. B. O'Neill
 "Elephant" by Spiral System
 "Production" by Lemonworks
 "Something Bigger, Something Better" by Amanda Blank
 "Stone" by Terry Lynn
 "(Your Love Keeps Lifting Me) Higher and Higher" by Jackie Wilson

Reception
Critical response
On Rotten Tomatoes, a review aggregator, the film has an approval rating of 66% based on 231 reviews and an average rating of 6.10/10. The site's critical consensus reads, "An uneasy blend of action and comedy, Date Night doesn't quite live up to the talents of its two leads, but Steve Carell and Tina Fey still manage to shine through most of the movie's flaws." On Metacritic, the film has a score of 56 out of 100 based on 37 critics, indicating "mixed or average reviews". Audiences polled by CinemaScore gave the film an average grade of "B" on an A+ to F scale.

Roger Ebert gave the film three and a half stars, saying "If you don't start out liking the Fosters and hoping they have a really nice date night, not much else is going to work." Jim Vejvoda of IGN gave the movie 3 out of 5 stars saying "Date Night suggests a lot of comedic possibilities (Wahlberg's character being just one of them, and the Fosters' escape from the police station being another example) but it never quite capitalizes on all of these set-ups. Despite these shortcomings, the film still manages to be a lot of fun".

Box office 
On its opening weekend, 20th Century Fox reported that Date Night grossed $27.1 million, about $200,000 more than Warner Bros. reported for Clash of the Titans. In a recount, Clash of the Titans retained the number-one spot for a second-straight weekend with $26.6 million. Date Night debuted at number two with $25.2 million, nearly $2 million less than Fox had reported a day earlier. The film went on to gross $98.7 million in the United States and Canada and $53.6 million in other countries totaling a worldwide gross of $152.3 million.

Awards and nominations
The film won the Teen Choice Award for Movie Comedy and Fey won the Teen Choice Award for Movie Actress: Comedy.

Home mediaDate Night'' was released on DVD and Blu-ray on August 10, 2010. The DVD includes both the theatrical (88 minutes) and extended (101 minutes) versions of the film, alternate scenes, two featurettes, public service announcements, and a gag reel.

See also

 2010 in film
 Cinema of the United States
 List of American films of 2010

References

External links
 
 
 
 
 

2010 films
2010 crime films
2010 romantic comedy films
2010s chase films
2010s crime comedy films
2010s English-language films
2010s screwball comedy films
20th Century Fox films
Regency Enterprises films
21 Laps Entertainment films
American chase films
American crime comedy films
American romantic comedy films
American screwball comedy films
Dune Entertainment films
Films about couples
Films directed by Shawn Levy
Films scored by Christophe Beck
Films set in New Jersey
Films set in New York City
Films shot in Los Angeles
Films shot in New York City
Films with screenplays by Josh Klausner
Romantic crime films
2010s American films